Gorgoroth is a supplement published by Iron Crown Enterprises (ICE) in 1990 for the fantasy role-playing game Middle-earth Role Playing (MERP), which is itself based on the works of J.R.R. Tolkien.

Contents

Background
In Tolkien's published history of Middle Earth, following the fall of Numenor, Sauron realized that Gondor, the kingdom established by Elendil and his son Isildur, would rival lost Numenor in power and prestige, and created the country of Mordor to contest Gondor's might. The Plateau of Gorgoroth lay in the northwest corner of Mordor, and it was here, near the base of the volcano Mount Doom that Sauron established his fortress of Barad-dur.

Setting
Gorgoroth is a campaign setting that describes the Plateau of Gorgoroth and its surrounding terrain and peoples so that a gamemaster can set MERP adventures within these lands. The book is divided into four main parts:

Part 1: Guidelines for the gamemaster

Part 2:  Mordor
Geography, ecology, inhabitants, notable personalities, notable locations, and eight adventure hooks set in various time periods

Part 3: Locations of interest outside Mordor
 Special emphasis on the mining settlement of Bar Lithryn in the Ash Mountains, including four full adventures set in the settlement.

Part 4: Campaign Aids
 Creating an orc player character, languages of Gorgoroth, and gamemaster playing aids

Publication history
ICE published the licensed game Middle Earth Role-Playing in 1982, and then released many supplements for it over the next 17 years, until the Tolkien Estate withdrew their license in 1999. Gorgoroth, a 144-page softcover book with removable color map published by Iron Crown Enterprises in 1990, was written by John Crowdis, Keith Robley, Anders Blixt, Pete Fenlon, Coleman Charlton, and Jessica Ney, with interior art by Darrell Midgette and Liz Danforth, cartography by William Hyde, Jennifer Kleine, Kevin William, and Pete Fenlon, and cover art by Angus McBride.

Reviews
White Wolf #24 (Dec./Jan., 1990)

References

Middle-earth Role Playing supplements
Role-playing game supplements introduced in 1990